Sorich Park is in San Anselmo, California, US. It has trails leading into the surrounding hills and ridge line. The park borders the western part of central San Rafael, California, as well as Sleepy Hollow (part of unincorporated county land).

Sorich Park is about 60 acres in size and was acquired by the Town of San Anselmo in 1965. Before, it was a dairy ranch. The park supposedly got its name because the milk produced by the dairy was "so rich" that they made it one word and made it the name.

References

Parks in Marin County, California